Blindspotting is a 2018 American comedy-drama film written by, produced by and starring Daveed Diggs and Rafael Casal. Carlos López Estrada directs while Janina Gavankar, Jasmine Cephas Jones, Ethan Embry, Tisha Campbell-Martin, Utkarsh Ambudkar, and Wayne Knight also star. The plot follows a parolee with three days left on his sentence, only to have him witness a police shooting that threatens to ruin a lifelong friendship.

Casal and Diggs, childhood friends in real-life, wrote the screenplay in the mid-2000s, initially to speak for the city of Oakland, which they felt was often misrepresented in film. After years of delays, the pair's schedules finally allowed them to make the film, with principal photography beginning in June 2017.

Blindspotting had its world premiere on January 18, 2018 in the U.S. Dramatic Competition section at the 2018 Sundance Film Festival and was released in the United States on July 20, 2018, by Lionsgate. The film received positive reviews from critics, and at the 34th Independent Spirit Awards, was nominated for Best Male Lead for Diggs' performance, while López Estrada earned a Directors Guild of America Award nomination for Outstanding Directing – First-Time Feature Film.

A spin-off sequel television series of same name, created and executive produced by Diggs and Casal and run by Casal, premiered in 2021. It focuses on Jones' character, Ashley, with Diggs and Casal reprising their roles as guests.

Plot
Collin Hoskins (Daveed Diggs), a convicted felon, is struggling to finish the last three days of his probation. Collin, along with his short-tempered best friend Miles Turner (Rafael Casal), works for a moving company located in Oakland, California. One night while waiting for a red light, Collin witnesses a white police officer (Ethan Embry) using lethal force on a fleeing black suspect. As Collin is haunted by the incident, he begins to have nightmares and experiences hallucinations.

At the same time, Miles becomes distraught by the gentrification of Oakland, and a resulting sense of loss of identity, home, and belonging.

Miles purchases a gun from a friend on the basis of self-protection, an action of which Collin strongly disapproves. As Miles continues to display erratic behavior, Collin's ex-girlfriend Val (Janina Gavankar) warns Collin of the dangers that may result from a continued friendship with Miles. Later that evening while having dinner, Miles' gun accidentally ends up in the hands of his young son Sean, an incident which horrifies Sean's mother Ashley (Jasmine Cephas Jones), who forces both Miles and Collin to leave the house.

At a party, an agitated Miles brutally assaults a black man who misinterpreted Miles' persona as cultural appropriation, leading to a fight between the two. Miles uses his gun to terrorize the party guests before being stopped by Collin. In an explosive argument, Collin criticizes Miles for his reckless behavior and the trouble it keeps causing him.

With his probation now over, Collin continues to feel psychologically troubled by the police shooting he saw. As he and Miles are finishing a moving job, the house is revealed to be that of Officer Molina, the same officer whom Collin witnessed using lethal force on a fleeing black man a few days earlier. Collin trespasses to the officer's garage and holds the officer at gun point. Miles comes in to witness as Collin launches into a rant in the form of freestyle rap, criticizing the relationship between the police and black America, and gentrification in Oakland. He breaks some of the officer's property, but ends up not shooting him, leaving the distraught officer behind. Following a moment of solemnity, Collin and Miles repair their friendship as they drive off to their next job.

Cast
 Daveed Diggs as Collin Hoskins, a former convicted felon on his last three days of probation. He is friendly and laid back. 
 Rafael Casal as Miles Turner, Collin's short-tempered and reckless best friend. The two have been close since childhood.
 Janina Gavankar as Val, a desk secretary and Collin's love interest. According to Miles, she never visited him while in prison. She urges Collin to end his relationship with Miles because Miles could get Collin in trouble.
 Jasmine Cephas Jones as Ashley, Miles' partner and mother of Sean.
 Ethan Embry as Officer Molina
 Tisha Campbell-Martin as Mama Liz
 Utkarsh Ambudkar as Rin
 Wayne Knight as Patrick
 Justin Chu Cary as Tin
 Kevin Carroll as James
 Nyambi Nyambi as Yorkie
 Lance Cameron Holloway as Curtis 'Cuttie' Cuttworth
 Margo Hall as Nancy, Collin's mother
 Jon Chaffin as Dez
 Leland Orser as Judge 
 Sarah Kay as Angela
 Travis Parker as Randall Marshall

Production

Background
The screenplay for Blindspotting was written by Rafael Casal and Daveed Diggs over a period of nine years. Daveed, who grew up in Oakland, and Rafael, who grew up in bordering Berkeley, California, felt that cinematic portrayals of the San Francisco Bay Area have constantly "missed something". They wanted to draw attention to the culture, community, and sense of "heightened reality" that shape life in Oakland. The film addresses issues of gentrification, police violence, and racism.

Filming
Principal photography finally began in June 2017 and lasted for 22 days, filming around Oakland. Diggs hired John Mader, drummer for Hamilton, to play drums on the film score.

Release
Blindspotting premiered at Sundance Film Festival on January 18, 2018, and was limited released in the United States on July 20, 2018, with a nationwide release date of July 27, 2018.

Reception

Box office
Blindspotting grossed $332,500 in its opening weekend from 14 locations, including in Los Angeles, New York City, San Francisco, and Oakland, for a $23,750 average per theater. It expanded to 513 theaters in its second weekend and made $1.3 million.

Critical response
The website's critical consensus reads, "As timely as it is overall impactful, Blindspotting blends buddy comedy with seething social commentary, and rises on the strength of Daveed Diggs' powerful performance." On Metacritic, the film has a weighted average score of 77 out of 100, based on 43 critics, indicating "generally favorable reviews".

Former United States President Barack Obama named Blindspotting among his favorite films of 2018, in his annual list of favorite films.

Television adaptation 

In September 2020, Starz ordered a TV spinoff of Blindspotting, with Jasmine Cephas Jones set to reprise her role as Ashley. Daveed Diggs and Rafael Casal act as writers and executive producers on the series, with Casal to serve as showrunner. The pair each also reprise their roles in the premiere episode. The series will focus on Ashley's point of view when Miles is imprisoned. Production began in December 2020.

See also 
 List of hood films

References

External links

 

2018 films
2018 comedy-drama films
2010s buddy comedy-drama films
2018 independent films
American buddy comedy-drama films
American independent films
2010s hip hop films
American comedy-drama films
2010s English-language films
Summit Entertainment films
Lionsgate films
Films directed by Carlos López Estrada
Films set in Oakland, California
Films shot in California
Films about police brutality
Films scored by Michael Yezerski
Films produced by Keith Calder
Films adapted into television shows
2010s American films